Tessari is an Italian surname. Notable people with the surname include:

Daniele Tessari, Italian motorcycle speedway rider
Duccio Tessari (1926–1994), Italian film director, screenwriter and actor
Girolamo Tessari (c. 1480 – c. 1561), Italian Renaissance painter
Luciano Tessari (born 1928), Italian footballer and manager
Lawrence Tessari (born 1949), Italian engineer who helped develop automotive infotainment systems

Italian-language surnames